Ching's Secret is a food brand founded in 1996 by Capital Foods and based in Mumbai, India. The Ching's Secret range of food products and ingredients include noodles, soups, sauces, masalas and chutneys.

History 

In 1995, Mr. Ajay Gupta launched Capital Foods. Using his marketing experience, he scouted the food market to explore profitable niches and homed in on Ching’s Secret, a brand that would offer Chinese food ingredients. He followed this up with Smith & Jones, a brand that would offer international foods and food ingredients.

Ching’s Secret debuted the staple trilogy of Chinese sauces - Soy Sauce, Red Chilli Sauce, Green Chilli Sauce. This was followed up with an offering of noodles, dubbed as Hakka Noodles in India. In August, 2015, the company established the category of Desi Chinese, an Indo-Chinese fusion cuisine.

Controversy
On 15 June 2015, a newspaper report stated that Ching's Secret noodles had failed a quality test administered by a government agency. The agency had then initiated court proceedings against the company, "for selling products that were found with hazardous chemicals.

See also 
 List of instant noodle brands
 
 Capital Foods Pvt. Ltd.

References

External links 

 

Instant noodle brands
Indian brands